Kevon Harris (born June 24, 1997) is an American professional basketball player for the Orlando Magic of the National Basketball Association (NBA) on a two-way contract with the Lakeland Magic of the NBA G League. Harris played college basketball at Stephen F. Austin.

Early life and high school
Harris was born and grew up in Ellenwood, Georgia and attended Martin Luther King Jr. High School. As a senior, he averaged  15.8 points and 11.8 rebounds per game and led the team to a 24–6 record and the Class 5A state semifinal. After high school, Harris completed a postgraduate year at DME Academy in Daytona Beach, Florida. He signed with Stephen F. Austin for college basketball over offers from Utah State, Texas A&M and UT-Arlington.

College career
Harris became a starter for the Lumberjacks during his true freshman season, averaging 8.5 points and 3.6 rebounds per game. As a sophomore, he averaged 14.5 points, 5.5 rebounds, 1.3 assists per game and was named second team All-Southland Conference. Harris averaged 17.8 points, 6.5 rebounds, 2.0 assists, 1.0 steals as a junior and was again named second team All-Southland Conference. He surpassed the 1,000 point milestone during the season. He initially declared for the 2019 NBA draft, but opted to return to Stephen F. Austin for his senior season. Harris became the school's all-time leading scorer at the Division I level on February 19, during a 14-point performance in a win over Central Arkansas, passing Thomas Walkup. Following the end of the regular season, Harris was named the Southland Conference Men's Basketball Player of the Year and first team All-Southland Conference. He finished fourth in the conference in scoring with 17.5 points per game and also averaged 5.7 rebounds, 2.1 assists, and 1.5 steals per game.

Professional career

Raptors 905 (2021–2022) 
After going undrafted in the 2020 NBA draft, Harris was selected 11th overall in the January 2021 NBA G League draft by the Raptors 905.

On August 20, 2021, Harris signed with Zadar of the HT Premijer liga and the ABA League. On October 6, 2021, he parted ways with Zadar. Harris rejoined the Raptors 905 in October 2021.

Orlando Magic (2022–present) 
Harris joined the Minnesota Timberwolves in the 2022 NBA Summer League. In his Summer League debut, Harris scored thirteen points in a 85–77 win over the Denver Nuggets.

On July 25, 2022, Harris signed with the Orlando Magic on a two-way contract. On December 29, he was suspended by the NBA for one game without pay due to coming off the bench during an altercation in a game against the Detroit Pistons the day before.

References

External links
Stephen F. Austin Lumberjacks bio
College Statistics at Sports-Reference.com
RealGM profile

1997 births
Living people
21st-century African-American sportspeople
ABA League players
African-American basketball players
American expatriate basketball people in Canada
American expatriate basketball people in Croatia
American men's basketball players
Basketball players from Georgia (U.S. state)
KK Zadar players
Lakeland Magic players
Orlando Magic players
Raptors 905 players
Shooting guards
Stephen F. Austin Lumberjacks basketball players
Undrafted National Basketball Association players